The Adventures of Sherlock Holmes and Dr. Watson is a 1980 Soviet film adaptation of Arthur Conan Doyle's stories about Sherlock Holmes. It is the second film (episodes 3–5) in The Adventures of Sherlock Holmes and Dr. Watson film series directed by Igor Maslennikov.

The film is based on three stories by Conan Doyle: "The Adventure of Charles Augustus Milverton", "The Final Problem", and "The Adventure of the Empty House".

Part 1: The King of Blackmailers
After solving another case, Sherlock Holmes and Doctor Watson return to London by train.

Shortly afterwards, Holmes and Watson are invited to The Diogenes Club by Sherlock's older brother Mycroft. The club hosts the most unsociable men of London, and they have banned talking. Once there, Mycroft, asks him to help Lady Eva Blackwell. She is being blackmailed by one of the most villainous men of London, Charles Augustus Milverton who is demanding £7,000 for some letters he has stolen from her, threatening to release them to the public if she does not pay the ransom. Upon their release, the letters would cause a scandal that would end Lady Eva's marriage engagement. Sherlock agrees to help her.

The same day, Milverton himself shows up at 221B. He reveals that he knows about Holmes' task and requests £7,000 for the safe return of the letters. Sherlock and Watson decide that stealing the letters from Milverton is their only course of action. The two break into Milverton's headquarters at night and find the letters in his safe, but they hide when Charles Augustus suddenly appears in the room. He has a meeting with a supposed maidservant offering to sell letters that would compromise her mistress.

In the end, Holmes and Watson find an encrypted letter which divulges details of the continuing mystery.

Cast 
 Vasily Livanov as Sherlock Holmes
 Vitaly Solomin as Dr. Watson
 Rina Zelyonaya as Mrs. Hudson
 Borislav Brondukov as Inspector Lestrade (voiced by Igor Yefimov)
 Boris Klyuyev as Mycroft Holmes
 Anatoly Podshivalov as Price the marker

The King of Blackmailers 
 Boris Ryzhukhin as Charles Milverton
 Valentina Panina as Lady Huxley
 Svetlana Kryuchkova as Agatha, Milverton's maid

The Mortal Combat 
 Nikolai Kryukov as Colonel Moran
 Viktor Yevgrafov as Professor Moriarty (voiced by Oleg Dahl)
 Alexander Zakharov as Ronald Adair (voiced by Vyacheslav Baranov)
 Alexey Kozhevnikov as Mr. Murray
 Ignat Leirer as Peter Steiller Jr.
 Yury Eller as Moriarty's henchman
 Igor Andronnikov as Moriarty's henchman

The Tiger Hunt 
 Igor Dmitriev as Inspector Gregson
 Alexander Zakharov as Ronald Adair (voiced by Vyacheslav Baranov)
 Alexey Kozhevnikov as Mr. Murray
 Nikolai Kryukov as Colonel Moran
 Viktor Yevgrafov as Professor Moriarty (voiced by Oleg Dahl)
 Valery Smolyakov as the cabman
 Irina Kraslavskaya as Judy, Adair's maid
 E. Kharkevich as Adair's mother
 Alexander Zakharov as Adair's butler

References

External links

1980 films
1980s Russian-language films
Sherlock Holmes films based on works by Arthur Conan Doyle
Lenfilm films
Soviet television miniseries
1980s crime drama films
Films directed by Igor Maslennikov
1980s Soviet television series
Soviet crime drama films
Russian mystery films
1980s television miniseries
Soviet crime television series